Sir William Spring, 1st Baronet (1613 – 17 December 1654) was an English Parliamentarian politician and a member of the Spring family of Pakenham, Suffolk.

Life
William was the son of Sir William Spring (died 1637) and his wife Elizabeth Smith. Like his father, he was educated at Emmanuel College, Cambridge. The only surviving son, he inherited the family lands from his father, including Pakenham Hall and Cockfield Hall. He lived for many years at Newe House, Pakenham, which he purchased from Sir Robert Bright.

Spring was knighted by Charles I and served as High Sheriff of Suffolk in 1641. During the Stour Valley anti-popery riots of August 1642, Sir William was ordered by Parliament to search Hengrave Hall, the house of his cousin, Lady Penelope Darcy, where it was thought arms for a Catholic insurrection were being stored. He was created a baronet, of Pakenham in the Baronetage of England, on 11 August 1642 by Charles I. This was despite Spring being widely known as a committed Parliamentarian who openly opposed the king's policies.

Throughout the Civil War Spring travelled the eastern counties of England, helping to recruit soldiers to the Parliamentarian army and maintain Parliament's control of East Anglia. Although there is no evidence that Sir William engaged in armed combat on behalf of the cause of Parliament, he was a prominent member of the Bury St. Edmunds Committee of the Eastern Association, which recruited men for Cromwell's Ironsides. He was in regular correspondence with Oliver Cromwell, who notably wrote to Spring regarding the Good Old Cause. In the summer of 1643, Spring refused to recognise a troop of Ironsides raised by Captain Raphe Margery, as Spring deemed Margery, who was not from a gentry family, to be too low-born to lead men into battle. Cromwell intervened, telling Spring that he did not care which social class his soldiers came from, as long as they believed in Parliament's cause. In September 1643, Cromwell wrote to Spring, saying: I had rather have a plain russet-coated captain that knows what he fights for, and loves what he knows, than that which you call a gentleman and is nothing else. He was a staunch friend of Sir Nathaniel Barnardiston of Kedington, a notable advocate of the Puritan cause, upon whose death he wrote an acrostic elegy. Spring was elected in 1645 as a recruiter for the Long Parliament for Bury St Edmunds, and sat from 1646 to 1648, when he was secluded by Pride's Purge. Spring sat in the First Protectorate Parliament for Suffolk in 1654 and died at the end of that year. He was buried on 19 December; his eldest son William succeeded him.

Family
William married Elizabeth L'Estrange, the daughter of Lady Alice and Sir Hamon L'Estrange, with whom he had six children:
Sir William Spring, 2nd Baronet (1642–1684), married first Mary, daughter of Dudley North, 4th Baron North (no issue) and married second Sarah, daughter of Sir Robert Cordell, 1st Baronet of Melford Hall, Suffolk, with whom he had three children.
Thomas Spring, died unmarried in 1677, Fellow of Gonville and Caius College, Cambridge.
John Spring Traveled and settled in the New World becoming a prominent member and politician in Watertown MA
Elizabeth Spring, died unmarried
Catherine Spring, married (1st) Capt. Laurence, (2nd) John Palgrave
Dorothy Spring (1648–1714/15), married Sir Christopher Calthorpe in 1664

Ancestry

References

1613 births
1654 deaths
Baronets in the Baronetage of England
High Sheriffs of Suffolk
William
Roundheads
17th-century English Puritans
English MPs 1640–1648
English MPs 1654–1655
Alumni of Emmanuel College, Cambridge